100cc is a compilation album by the English rock band 10cc.

It was released in 1975 by UK Records, the band's original label, to capitalize on the then 10cc's recent departure to Mercury Records and band's success in the immediate aftermath of the release of their third album, The Original Soundtrack, and the "I'm Not in Love" single.

The UK edition of the compilation contains a selection of singles on the first side, while the second side contains all of the non-album b-sides from the first two albums' singles.

Around the same time "Waterfall" b/w "4% of Something" was released as a single by UK Records.

Track listing

UK edition
Side one
 "Rubber Bullets" (Kevin Godley, Lol Creme, Graham Gouldman) – 5:18
 "Donna" (Godley, Creme) – 2:54
 "The Dean and I" (Godley, Creme) – 3:03
 "The Wall Street Shuffle" (Eric Stewart, Gouldman) – 4:02
 "Silly Love" (Creme, Stewart) – 3:56
Side two
 "Waterfall" (Stewart, Gouldman) – 3:41
 "4% of Something" (Stewart, Creme) – 4:01
 "Gismo My Way" (Stewart, Gouldman, Godley, Creme) – 3:44
 "Hot Sun Rock" (Stewart, Gouldman) – 3:01
 "Bee in My Bonnet" (Stewart, Gouldman) – 2:02
 "18 Carat Man of Means" (Gouldman, Stewart, Godley, Creme) – 3:27

U.S. edition
Side one
 "Old Wild Men" (Godley, Creme) – 3:18
 "The Wall Street Shuffle" (Stewart, Gouldman) – 3:30
 "Somewhere in Hollywood" (Godley, Creme) – 5:28
 "Rubber Bullets" (Godley, Creme, Gouldman) – 4:41
 "Waterfall" (Stewart, Gouldman) – 3:41
Side two
 "The Worst Band in the World" (Creme, Gouldman) – 2:45
 "Donna" (Godley, Creme) – 2:54
 "The Dean and I" (Godley, Creme) – 3:03
 "Fresh Air for My Momma" (Godley, Creme, Stewart) – 3:02
 "Silly Love" (Creme, Stewart)– 3:56

Personnel
 Eric Stewart – guitar, keyboards, vocals
 Graham Gouldman – bass, guitar, percussion, vocals
 Lol Creme – guitar, keyboards, percussion, vocals
 Kevin Godley – drums, percussion, vocals

References

10cc albums
1975 compilation albums